The Sheridan County Courthouse in McClusky, North Dakota, United States, was designed in the Art Deco style by architect Ira Rush.  It was built in 1938 and was listed on the National Register of Historic Places in 1985.

It is a four-story  steel-reinforced concrete building.  It was argued to be significant for "providing a stabilizing influence upon political activities on the local and county levels" as the investment in a substantial building would reduce or eliminate rivalry for towns to seize the county seat.

It was one of numerous North Dakota courthouses studied in 1985.

References

Art Deco architecture in North Dakota
County courthouses in North Dakota
Courthouses on the National Register of Historic Places in North Dakota
Government buildings completed in 1938
1938 establishments in North Dakota
National Register of Historic Places in Sheridan County, North Dakota